Geranylfarnesyl pyrophosphate is an intermediate used by organisms in the biosynthesis of sesterterpenoids.

References

Bibliography 

Organophosphates
Terpenes and terpenoids